The Myth of the Male Orgasm is a Canadian romantic comedy film, directed by John Hamilton and released in 1993.

The film stars Bruce Dinsmore as Jimmy Rovinski, a man whose lack of success with women leads him to sign up for a feminist study on male attitudes about sex and romance conducted by project leader "Jane Doe" (Miranda de Pencier). The cast also includes Mark Camacho and Burke Lawrence as Jimmy's roommates Tim and Sean, Ruth Marshall as his friend Mimi with whom he is in unrequited love, and Macha Grenon as his ex-girlfriend Paula.

The film premiered on September 1, 1993, at the Montreal World Film Festival.

Ray Bonneville and Brad Hayes received a Genie Award nomination for Best Original Song at the 15th Genie Awards, for the song "Say Those Things".

References

External links 
 

1993 films
1993 romantic comedy films
Canadian romantic comedy films
English-language Canadian films
Films shot in Montreal
1990s English-language films
1990s Canadian films